Dithyrea californica (spectacle pod, California spectacle pod, California shield pod) is an annual plant in the family Brassicaceae found in deserts of the Southwestern United States.

References

Brassicaceae